Rear Admiral Nigel Stephen Coates,  (8 March 1959 – 2 June 2010) was a senior officer in the Royal Australian Navy.

Early life and education 
Coates joined the Royal Australian Naval College at Jervis Bay in 1975 as a Junior Entry officer, where he completed his high school education.

Coates spent 18 months in Newport, Rhode Island, where he attended the US Naval War College and earned a Master of Arts (International Relations) from Salve Regina University.

Naval career 
Coates joined the Royal Australian Navy in 1975.

In 1993, he was promoted to commander and served at the Australian Defence Force Academy, initially as Senior Military Instructor, and then as Commanding Officer of the Corps of Officer Cadets. In 1998, he assumed command of Sea Training at MHQ, and in 1999 attended the US Naval War College.

In mid-2002 he was appointed Chief of Staff to the Chief of the Defence Force in Canberra, and in late 2003 he was promoted to commodore and appointed Chief of Staff, at Headquarters Australian Theatre in Sydney. In 2005, he returned to Canberra as Director General, Navy Personnel and Training.

In July 2007, he was promoted to rear admiral and appointed Commander Australian Fleet. He relinquished command of the Fleet in October 2009 and was relieved by Rear Admiral Steve Gilmore.

Personal 
According to his official biography, "Coates and his wife Vickie enjoy sailing and have three children who also enjoy sailing – occasionally."

In 1996, while sailing in the Australian Capital Territory, he suffered a traumatic amputation of the top of his ring finger.

Coates was diagnosed with an aggressive brain cancer in late 2009, shortly after relinquishing command of the Australian Fleet. He died on 2 June 2010, aged 51, at the Medical Centre, Royal Military College, Duntroon, in Canberra. The funeral service with full naval honours was held in the Naval Dockyard Chapel, Garden Island, on 9 June 2010.

Honours and awards 
Queen's Gold Medal (Dux of RAN Initial Training course)
Jubilee Sword (Dux of Seamen Officers training course)
1991 Maritime Commander's Commendation
1995 Chief of the Defence Force Commendation
1997 Gloucester Cup (Commanding officer, HMAS Canberra)
2001 Gloucester Cup (Commanding Officer, HMAS Anzac)

References and notes

External links 
Official photo (copyright)
Op Catalyst ANZAC Day video
HMAS Rankin awarded Gloucester Cup L-R: RADM Coates, MAJGEN Jeffery (Rtd), CMDR Stanford, CDRE Richard Shalders, 8 April 2008 (Hi res) (source) (copyright)
Links at http://www.navy.gov.au:
 Bio
 LCDR Fenn Kemp and LEUT Angeline Lewis,  Navy mourns tragic loss of RADM Nigel Coates, Navy.gov.au, 7 June 2010
 RAN farewells top Admiral with full ceremonial honours in Sydney, Navy.gov.au, 9 June 2010
 RADM Nigel Coates – Messages of Condolence
 Navy News, Volume 53, No. 10, dated 10 June 2010
 Picture as Commander Australian Fleet, taken on 17 October 2008. (copyright)

|-

1959 births
2010 deaths
Naval War College alumni
Australian military personnel of the War in Afghanistan (2001–2021)
Commanders Australian Fleet
Graduates of the Royal Australian Naval College
Members of the Order of Australia
Royal Australian Navy admirals
Salve Regina University alumni
Deaths from brain cancer in Australia